The 2006 U.S. House of Representatives election for the state of North Dakota's at-large congressional district was held November 7, 2006. The incumbent, Democratic-NPL Congressman Earl Pomeroy was re-elected to his eighth term, defeating Republican candidate Matt Mechtel.

Only Pomeroy filed as a Dem-NPLer, and the endorsed Republican candidate was Matt Mechtel of Fargo, North Dakota. Pomeroy and Mechtel won the primary elections for their respective parties.

Pomeroy increased his margin over his opposition for the third year in a row since 2002. This was because Mechtel was not known well throughout the state, and that the Republican Party itself was beginning to slump.

Election results

References

External links
2006 North Dakota U.S. House of Representatives Election results

2006
North Dakota
2006 North Dakota elections